Charles William Packe (23 September 1792 – 27 October 1867) was a British Conservative Party politician.

Family
Packe was the oldest son of Charles James Packe and Penelope Dugdale, daughter of Richard Dugdale of Blyth Hall. He was also the brother of Great Northern Railway deputy chairman and Liberal politician George Hussey Packe. He married Kitty Jenkyn Reading, daughter of Thomas Hort, in 1822.

Wealth

He inherited Prestwold Hall upon his father's death in 1837, and later acquired Glen Hall and an 18-acre estate in southern Leicestershire for £2,530 in 1837 and, a decade later, Stretton Hall for £30,000, financed by a mortgage from Sir George Robinson. In 1842, he commissioned William Burn to redesign Prestwold Hall, spending a reported £70,000 over the next two decades on improvements and further land close to the hall. A decade later, he spent £12,000 on a house and 745 acres of land at Branksome in Dorset, also using Burn, via a loan of £7,000.

Packe was also a keen investor in bank stock, government consols, and railway shares, the latter of which he had £4,050 in during the mid-1840s.

By the time of his death, Packe owned 2,464 acres in Leicestershire, worth £4,267 gross a year, with a gross personal wealth of £35,000.

Political career
He was elected MP for South Leicestershire at a by-election in 1836 and held the seat until his death in 1867. During this time, he rented a home at Richmond Terrace, just off Whitehall, in London.

References

External links
 

Conservative Party (UK) MPs for English constituencies
UK MPs 1835–1837
UK MPs 1837–1841
UK MPs 1841–1847
UK MPs 1847–1852
UK MPs 1852–1857
UK MPs 1857–1859
UK MPs 1859–1865
UK MPs 1865–1868
1792 births
1867 deaths